Yanbian Longding Football Club is a professional Chinese football club based in Longjing, Yanbian Korean Autonomous Prefecture, Jilin Province. They currently play in Chinese League Two.

History
The club was founded as Longjing Hailanjiang F.C. in 2017. In 2019, after the dissolution of Yanbian Funde, it was renamed as Yanbian Hailanjiang, and plays in 2019 Chinese Champions League.

Name history
2017–2018 Longjing Hailanjiang 龙井海兰江
2019–2020 Yanbian Hailanjiang 延边海兰江
2021- Yanbian Longding 延边龙鼎

Players

Current squad

Managerial history
2019 Jin Qing
2019— Li Zaihao

References

External links

Football clubs in China
Association football clubs established in 2017
2017 establishments in China